The Nokia E5-00 also called Nokia E5 is a Symbian smartphone.  Like all smartphones in the Nokia Eseries it is targeted at business-to-business and comes with business software applications, including QuickOffice (Office document editor). It was released in the third quarter of 2010. It comes in a candybar form factor with QWERTY keyboard. It is considered a budget smartphone and thus, a successor of the Nokia E63.

Features
The E5-00 is very similar to the E72. It has more DRAM memory than the E72 but also has some important cost reductions. One cost reduction is the technology of the LCDs screen. The E5-00 has a transmissive LCD display while the E72 has a transflective LCD. E5 supports only 256k display colors. Other important cost reductions are the removal of the secondary camera, the accelerometer and the digital compass. The third is the "full focus" for the camera that extends the depth of field without narrowing the aperture, instead of autofocus.

The E5-00 has a smaller battery (1200 mAh) than the E72 (1500) but has the talk-time of 8 hours and stand by time over 10 days.

It also features a GPS, both integrated and assisted, and runs Nokia Maps 3.0 and Ovi maps. Nokia E5 supports Mail for Exchange and IBM Lotus Notes Traveler for corporate emails. E5 supports HD Voice.

Messaging
The Nokia E5-00 features IM (instant messenger), allowing access to several chat services or communities simultaneously. These include Yahoo! Messenger, Google Talk, Skype, WeChat, WhatsApp and Windows Live Messenger.

Reception
Reception of the E5 has generally been positive, CNET UK praised the quality of the full qwerty keyboard, but criticized the performance of the 320 × 240 pixel LCD, quoting it as "virtually impossible to see in direct sunlight". Softpedia in contrast stated that the LCD worked perfectly in sunlight.

Softpedia wrote that the E5-00 is "an all-rounder as it performs decent in all areas", though they also stated that the camera is not a very strong point.

References

External links
Nokia E5 page on Nokia website

Mobile phones introduced in 2010
Mobile phones with an integrated hardware keyboard
Nokia ESeries
Mobile phones with user-replaceable battery